Union College is a liberal arts college in Schenectady, New York, United States.

Union College may also refer to:
 Pacific Union College, Napa Valley, California, US
 Union College (Kentucky), Barbourville, Kentucky, US
 Union College (Nebraska), Lincoln, Nebraska, US
 Union College of Laguna, Philippines
 Union College of Law, now Northwestern University School of Law, Chicago, Illinois, US
 Union College, Tellippalai, Sri Lanka
 Union College, University of Queensland, Brisbane, Australia
 Union College (New Jersey), Cranford, New Jersey, US
 Union Graduate College, Schenectady, New York, US
 Union Theological College, Belfast, Northern Ireland, UK
 Adventist University of the Philippines, formerly Philippine Union College
 Burman University, formerly Canadian Union College, Lacombe, Alberta, Canada
 Atlantic Union College, South Lancaster, Massachusetts, US
 Washington Adventist University, formerly Columbia Union College, Takoma Park, Maryland, US

See also
 Union University (disambiguation)